Carmelo Imbriani (10 February 1976 – 15 February 2013) was an Italian footballer and former coach of Benevento in Lega Pro Prima Divisione.

Biography

Player career

Napoli and loans
Born in Benevento, Campania, 50 km northeast of Naples, Imbriani started his career at S.S.C. Napoli. He played his first Serie A match on 27 February 1994, substituted Renato Buso in the 79th minutes. The match Napoli lost to Cagliari 1–2. In 1995–96 season, he started to play regularly for Napoli, scored 2 goals in 25 league appearances.

He then spent 2 seasons loaned to Serie C1 sides Pistoiese and Casarano, before returned to Napoli in 1998, after Napoli relegated from Serie A in May. He played his last match for Napoli on 5 December 1998, along with Francesco Turrini replaced Massimiliano Esposito and Gennaro Scarlato in the 55th minutes, which also his first league match of the season. That match Napoli 0–0 draw with Torino. In January 1999, he left for another Serie B side Genoa.

Cosenza
In 1999–2000 season, he left for Serie B struggler Cosenza. He failed to play as a regular and only played 46 league matches in 3 seasons.

Benevento
In 2002–03 season Imbriani returned to hometown club Benevento and played 22 Serie C1 matches in the first season. He did not play any matches in 2003–04 season, and in January 2004 left for Foggia, also at Serie C1. In 2004–05 season, Imbriani returned to Benevento and made another 21 league appearances. In 2005, Benevento went bankrupt and a new team was re-founded in Serie C2, but Imbriani left for Serie B struggler Catanzaro on free transfer. But in January 2006, he returned to Benevento and played as a regular starter in the 2006-07 & 2007–08 season.

Coaching career

Benevento 
In September 2009, he was appointed as the coach of Benevento's Allievi Regionali U16 Youth Team.

From 29 November 2011 to 15 October 2012 he was the coach of Benevento in Lega Pro Prima Divisione in place of the sacked Giovanni Simonelli.

Illness and death
In August 2012, while still in charge of Benevento, Imbriani was discovered several lymphomas spread all over his body. Due to his condition, he was unable to fulfil his role in his final period at the club, and head coaching duties were effectively handled by his assistant Jorge Martínez, who resigned later in October; Imbriani successively tended his resignation immediately after Martínez left his role at the club.

Imbriani was hospitalized in Perugia due to his condition, receiving public solidarity from the whole Italian football world in his personal battle for life.

Imbriani died of leukemia in Perugia on 15 February 2013 at the age of 37.

References

External links

aic.football.it

1976 births
2013 deaths
Italian footballers
Italian football managers
Serie A players
Serie B players
S.S.C. Napoli players
U.S. Pistoiese 1921 players
Genoa C.F.C. players
Cosenza Calcio 1914 players
Benevento Calcio players
Benevento Calcio managers
Calcio Foggia 1920 players
U.S. Catanzaro 1929 players
Association football midfielders
Sportspeople from Benevento
Deaths from leukemia
Footballers from Campania
Deaths from cancer in Umbria